The Denmark women's national under-16 basketball team is a national women's basketball team of Denmark, administered by the Danish Basketball Association (DBBF). It represents the country in women's international under-16 basketball competitions.

FIBA U16 Women's European Championship participations

See also
Denmark women's national basketball team
Denmark women's national under-18 basketball team
Denmark men's national under-16 basketball team

References

External links
Archived records of Denmark team participations

Basketball teams in Denmark
Women's basketball in Denmark
Women's national under-16 basketball teams
Basketball